Narenderpal Singh or Narinder Pal Singh (17 October 1923 –  May 2003) was an Indian novelist who wrote in Punjabi. He was awarded the Sahitya Akademi Award in 1976 for his book Baa Mulahaza Hoshiar by the Government of India.

Life and career
Singh was born in Lyallpur, British India on 17 October 1923. He served in the armed forces from 1942, serving in West Asia during World War II. He later served as a military attache and was Military Secretary to the President of India from 1962–1966. He retired with the rank of Brigadier in 1972.

Singh was married to poet Prabhjot Kaur, who died in November 2016, at the age of 92. Singh suffered from osteoarthritis in later life. He died in 2003, at the age of 79.

Books 
Trapped
On the Crest of Time
The Flaming Hills
Mohan Singh
Furrows in the Snow
Light Stands Aside
Crossroads
Sūtaradhāra
Ṭāpū
Wālahu Nikkī

Awards
He won the Sahitya Akademi Award in 1976 for his book Baa Mulahaza Hoshiar (Be prepared for the royal visit).

See also
List of Sahitya Akademi Award winners for Punjabi

References

1923 births
2003 deaths
20th-century Indian novelists
Indian male novelists
Indian male writers
Punjabi-language writers
Recipients of the Sahitya Akademi Award in Punjabi
People from Faisalabad
Indian Army personnel of World War II